Thomas Riley is a Canadian former international soccer player. He won one cap for Canada in 1975. Riley is a member of the Newfoundland and Labrador Soccer Association Hall of Fame. He attended Memorial University of Newfoundland.

References

Year of birth missing (living people)
Living people
Canadian soccer players
Canada men's international soccer players
Association footballers not categorized by position
Soccer people from Newfoundland and Labrador
Memorial University of Newfoundland alumni